El Piedrero was a non-delimited territory of Ecuador situated between the provinces of Guayas and Cañar. It was incorporated into the Guayas Province by the decree issued by President Rafael Correa in 2017.

References 

Provinces of Ecuador
Imbabura Province